Bechir Seid Djimet Abdoulaye (Arabic: بشير سيد جمعة عبد الله; born 10 January 1994) is a Chadian professional footballer who plays as a centre-back for Chad Premier League club Elect-Sport FC and the Chad national team.

Honours 
Elect-Sport FC
 Chad Premier League: 2018, 2019
 Coupe de Ligue de N'Djamena: 2014

Notes

References 

1994 births
Living people
People from N'Djamena
Chadian footballers
Association football central defenders
Elect-Sport FC players
Chad Premier League players
Chad international footballers